Ryad Kamar Eddine Kenniche (born April 30, 1993 in Hussein Dey) is an Algerian footballer who last played for Olympique de Médéa in the Algerian Ligue Professionnelle 1. He can play as either a centre-back or right-back.

Club career
In the summer of 2015, the league's Dispute Resolution Commission terminated Kenniche's contract with USM El Harrach for unpaid back wages and, shortly after, he signed a two-year contract with ES Sétif.

References

External links
 

1993 births
Algeria under-23 international footballers
Algeria youth international footballers
Algerian footballers
Algerian Ligue Professionnelle 1 players
Algerian expatriate sportspeople in Saudi Arabia
Algerian expatriate footballers
ES Sétif players
Expatriate footballers in Saudi Arabia
NA Hussein Dey players
People from Hussein Dey (commune)
USM El Harrach players
Living people
2015 Africa U-23 Cup of Nations players
Footballers at the 2016 Summer Olympics
Olympic footballers of Algeria
Association football central defenders
Association football fullbacks
Al-Qadsiah FC players
Saudi Professional League players
21st-century Algerian people
US Tataouine players